Dastur Peshotanji Behramji Sanjana (1828–26 December 1898) was an Indian scholar and Zoroastrian head-priest (Dastur).
He was Principal of the Sir Jamshedji Jijibhoy Zartoshti (Zoroastrian) Madressa (seminary) in Bombay, and the Dastur (‘high-priest’) of the Wadia Atash Behram (fire temple).
Sanjana was one of the most learned high-priests and authorities on Pahlavi of his time.
In 1904 a Festschrift was published in his honour with an introduction by Edward William West.

References

Iranologists
Zoroastrian priests
1828 births
1898 deaths
Academic staff of the University of Mumbai
Zoroastrian studies scholars